This is a list of star systems within 60-65 light years of Earth.

See also
Lists of stars
 List of star systems within 55-60 light-years
 List of star systems within 65-70 light-years
List of nearest stars and brown dwarfs

References

star systems within 60–65 light-years
Star systems
star systems within 60–65 light-years